"One Way Ticket" is a 1967 song co-written by American composer Stephen J. Lawrence, which became Helen Reddy's first single.  The lyrics were written by Bruce Hart. It was introduced by Gloria Loring on her 1968 MGM Records album, Today, produced by Bob Morgan. Loring's original rendition was not, however, released as a single.

Helen Reddy cover

Helen Reddy covered "One Way Ticket" in 1968. It was a non-album single, and was excluded from any later compilations of her work as a result of her label change to Capitol Records. Reddy would later state - whether or not in absolute earnest - that this, her first single, sold (presumably in the US) six copies - five or even all six of them purchased by her mother-in-law. Reddy's rendition would in fact receive enough support in her native Australia to reach #83 on the national pop singles ranking, with the local hit parade for Melbourne - her birthplace - ranking the single as high as #43.

In 1973, Pickwick Records included her version on a variety LP entitled, "Helen Reddy/Shirley Bassey/Dusty Springfield."

In 1974 K-tel Records included "One Way Ticket" by Reddy in one of their TV albums, Dynamic Sound.

In 2005, Raven Records Australia included the song as a bonus track on the two-fer reissue of Helen's No Way to Treat a Lady/Music Music albums, using a tape furnished by Reddy, since none of sufficient quality could be found in the Universal vaults, which now owned Philips Records.

Chris Rayburn cover

Chris Rayburn, an American singer who worked in Britain during the 1960s, recorded "One Way Ticket" for a 1968 single released in the UK and in the US. It was produced in London by Mike Hurst and arranged by Harry Robinson. Rayburn's single was released a few months after Helen Reddy's.

Cass Elliot cover

Cass Elliot covered "One Way Ticket" in 1970.  Her version was included on her album, Mama's Big Ones.  It was released as a single in the UK in 1971 but failed to chart.

Elliot also performed "One Way Ticket" "live" on The Andy Williams Show and The Ray Stevens Show, circa 1970.

Later uses
 Elliot's version of "One Way Ticket" was featured in the 1996 British film Beautiful Thing, along with several other songs by Elliot and the Mamas and the Papas.
Helen Reddy's version of "One Way Ticket" was sampled in 1999 in the Fatboy Slim and Freddy Fresh song "Badder Badder Schwing".

References

External links
 

1968 debut singles
1971 singles
Helen Reddy songs
Cass Elliot songs
Songs written by Bruce Hart (songwriter)
Songs with music by Stephen J. Lawrence
1967 songs
Philips Records singles
Songs about trains